Kathri (Sindhi: ڪاٺڙي) is a small village located in the Sindh province in the southern area of Pakistan, about 60 kilometers south of Sukkur. The village can be accessed by only one road, which is connected to the highway nearby. The village is about 2 square kilometers in size and consists of many medium-sized buildings surrounded by grass fields towards the west and desert towards the east.

About 2 kilometers west from Kathri is the Nara Canal, which flows along the north–south highways towards Sanghar District in the south and into the Indus River in the north.

Khatri Road is the only road leading to the village, and is connected to Nara Road in the East and Canal Road in the West.

See also
 Nawabshah
 Kazi Ahmed
 Dour
 Bandhi

References

Villages in Sindh